Peperomia zipaquirana is a herbal plant from the genus Peperomia. It was described by William Trelease and Truman G. Yuncker in 1917. It is native to Colombia and Ecuador. It is found at an elevation of 2700 – 2900 meters in Colombia.

References

zipaquirana
Flora of South America
Flora of Colombia
Flora of Ecuador
Plants described in 1917
Taxa named by William Trelease
Taxa named by Truman G. Yuncker